Hans Wallner (born 29 May 1953) is an Austrian former ski jumper.

Career
He won a silver medal in the team large hill event at the 1982 FIS Nordic World Ski Championships in Oslo. Wallner's best finish at the Winter Olympics was 6th in the individual large hill at Innsbruck in 1976. He finished fifth in the FIS Ski-Flying World Championships 1975. Wallner's lone ski jumping victory came in a large hill event at Sapporo in 1981. After retiring he coached the Italian national team for a period.

World Cup

Standings

Wins

References

1953 births
Living people
Austrian male ski jumpers
Ski jumpers at the 1976 Winter Olympics
Ski jumpers at the 1984 Winter Olympics
Olympic ski jumpers of Austria
Austrian ski jumping coaches
FIS Nordic World Ski Championships medalists in ski jumping
People from Villach-Land
Sportspeople from Carinthia (state)
20th-century Austrian people